Micaela Schmidt (later Schmidt-Kubicki; born 25 January 1970) is a German rower. She competed in the women's eight event at the 1996 Summer Olympics.

References

External links
 

1970 births
Living people
German female rowers
Olympic rowers of Germany
Rowers at the 1996 Summer Olympics
Sportspeople from Chemnitz
East German female rowers
World Rowing Championships medalists for Germany
World Rowing Championships medalists for East Germany